Bineka  is a village in Mandla district of Madhya Pradesh state of India.

References

Villages in Mandla district